Aramesh Dustdar (24 May 1931 – 27 October 2021) was an Iranian philosopher, writer, scholar, and philosophy lecturer at Tehran University.

Dustdar received a Ph.D. degree in philosophy from the University of Bonn. He is known in n as a secular Heideggerian philosopher (in contrast to Reza Davari Ardakani who is a religious Heideggerian philosopher).

See also 
 Intellectual movements in Iran

References

External links 
 Personal website
 Defeating "Din-khou'ei" by Naser Etemadi 
Not private anymore
Demanding criticism
 About Akbar Ganji and his situation (bu Aramesh Doustdar)
 A critical analysis of the article: "About Akbar Ganji and his situation"
 BBC Persian article about Aramesh Dustdar

1931 births
2021 deaths
20th-century Iranian philosophers
Academic staff of the University of Tehran
University of Bonn alumni
Iranian atheists
Atheist philosophers
21st-century Iranian philosophers
Iranian critics